Lee Harold Carmichael (born September 22, 1949) is an American former professional football player who was a wide receiver in the National Football League (NFL) for thirteen seasons with the Philadelphia Eagles (1971–1983) and one season for the Dallas Cowboys (1984). Carmichael was the Director of Player Development and Alumni for the Eagles from 1998 to 2014, and a Fan Engagement Liaison from 2014 to 2015, before retiring again in 2015.

Early years
Carmichael attended William M. Raines High School in Jacksonville, Florida, where he played the trombone in the school's band. He began playing quarterback on the football team.

He walked-on at Southern University and became a tri-sport athlete. He used his 6'8" height to play on the basketball team as a center, and threw the javelin and discus for the track and field team. In football, he shifted to playing wide receiver, where he was a four-year starter, although he never led the team in receptions. He received All-conference honors as a senior. He was a teammate of Mel Blount.

In 1989, he was inducted into the Louisiana Sports Hall of Fame. In 2004, he was inducted into the Florida Sports Hall of Fame. In 2012, he was inducted into the Southwestern Athletic Conference Hall of Fame. In 2018, he was inducted into the Black College Football Hall of Fame.  In January 2020, he was elected as one of 10 seniors to the Centennial Slate for the Class of 2020 of the NFL Pro Football Hall of Fame.

Professional career
Carmichael was selected by the Philadelphia Eagles in the seventh round (161st overall) of the 1971 NFL Draft. As a rookie, he was converted into a tight end, starting in six out of the nine games and leading the team's tight ends with twenty receptions (fourth on the team).

The next year he was moved to wide receiver. In 1973, he had a breakout year with the arrival of head coach Mike McCormack, leading the league with 67 receptions for 1,116 yards (16.7-yard average) and was tied for fourth with nine receiving touchdowns.

His production fell in the next three seasons as the team struggled to find a reliable quarterback. In 1977, Ron Jaworski was named the starting quarterback, with Carmichael leading the team with 46 receptions for 665 yards and seven touchdowns.

He was elected to four Pro Bowls in his NFL career. He finished third in receiving yards in 1978 with 1,072 and was second in receiving touchdowns in 1979 with eleven.

In 1980, he set an NFL record at the time by catching passes in 127 consecutive NFL games while also helping the Eagles make an appearance in Super Bowl XV.

On May 11, 1984, he was waived by the Eagles. On August 8, he was signed as a free agent by the New York Jets, who were looking to improve their depth at wide receiver while Wesley Walker held out in a contract dispute and Lam Jones recovered from a broken collarbone. He was released on August 26.

On September 6, he signed with the Dallas Cowboys, who were looking for wide receiver depth after Tony Hill was injured in the season opener 20–13 win against the Los Angeles Rams. He played in two games and caught only one pass before being cut on November 14 and announcing his retirement.

He ended his career with 590 receptions for 8,985 yards with 79 career touchdown catches, along with 64 rushing yards on nine carries. He currently ranks 25th all-time in career touchdown receptions, but he was seventh all-time at the time of his retirement. His career catches ranked fifth all-time when he retired. He retired as the Eagles' all-time leader in pass receptions, receiving yards, receiving touchdowns, and total touchdowns (79), with all four records still standing as of early 2017. He also holds Eagles post-season records for receiving yards (465), touchdowns (six), yards per reception (sixteen), and yards per game (66.4). He and Brent Celek are the only Eagles with three touchdowns in a single post-season (1979), and he is one of four players with two touchdowns in a single post-season game. He holds the Eagles record for most games with a touchdown for both the regular season (69) and playoffs (five, shared with Duce Staley and Brian Westbrook). At 6 foot 8 inches, he is believed to be the tallest wide receiver in the history of the NFL.

Carmichael was selected to the NFL 1970s All-Decade Team by voters of the Pro Football Hall of Fame. From 1973 to 1983, Carmichael led all NFL receivers in receptions, receiving yards, and touchdowns. In 1987, he was inducted into the Eagles Hall of Fame. The Professional Football Researchers Association named him to the PRFA Hall of Very Good Class of 2009.

On January 15, 2020, Carmichael was elected to the Pro Football Hall of Fame Class of 2020.

Personal life
After retiring from his playing career, he settled in South Jersey and joined a Philadelphia travel agency as a vice president for sales. He later operated various businesses, including steel fabrication and sports marketing.

In 1998, Carmichael was named the director of player and community relations for the Eagles, a newly created position where he would be a "combination mentor, confidant, troubleshooter, and liaison between the players and the authority figures in the organization". He was moved to a Fan Engagement Liaison position in 2014, and retired from that role on April 2, 2015. He currently works as an ambassador for the team in his retirement.

References

1949 births
Living people
William M. Raines High School alumni
Players of American football from Jacksonville, Florida
American football wide receivers
Southern Jaguars football players
Philadelphia Eagles players
Dallas Cowboys players
National Conference Pro Bowl players
Pro Football Hall of Fame inductees